Sound of the Underground may refer to:

 Sound of the Underground (album), the 2003 debut studio album by Girls Aloud
 "Sound of the Underground" (song), the title track and lead single from the aforementioned album
 Sound of the Underground, 1994 Toronto house compilation by SPG Records
 "Sound of the Underground", a track by Dave Koz from the album Saxophonic

See also
 True Sound of the Underground, an album by Sister Sin
 The Solid Sound of the Underground, a compilation album by So Solid Crew
 The Toronto Sound of the Underground, a 1994 compilation album by SPG Records
 "Jack to the Sound of the Underground", a 1988 single by Hithouse